The Pohru River (Urdu: پوہرو) is a stream located near Doabgah village of Jammu and Kashmir, India. Pohru River is one of the tributaries of the river Jehlum.

References

Rivers of Jammu and Kashmir